Telescopus beetzi, commonly known as Beetz's tiger snake, is a species of snake in the family Colubridae. The species is native to southern Africa.

Etymology
The specific name, beetzi, is in honor of German geologist Paul Friedrich Werner Beetz (1887–1954), who collected the holotype.

Common names
Common names for T. beetzi include Beetz's tiger snake, Karoo tiger snake, and Namib tiger snake.

Geographic range
T. beetzi is found in southern Namibia and northwestern South Africa.

Habitat

Description
T. beetzi is a slender, medium-sized snake. Females are larger than males. The dorsal scales are arranged in 21 rows at midbody, and the anal plate is undivided.

Behavior
T. beetzi is nocturnal and partially arboreal.

Diet
T. beetzi preys upon lizards.

Reproduction
T. beetzi is oviparous. Clutch size is 3–5 eggs.

References

Further reading
Baard EHW, Boycott RC, Broadley DG, Lambiris AJL (1987). "New herpetological distribution records in the Western Cape Province". Journal of the Herpetological Association of Africa 33 (1): 29–31. (Telescopus beetzi, p. 29).
Barbour T (1922). "A New Snake from Southwest Africa". Proceedings of the Biological Society of Washington 35: 229–230. (Tarbophis beetzii, new species, p. 230).

Telescopus
Reptiles described in 1922
Reptiles of Africa